"Spider" John Koerner (born August 31, 1938, in Rochester, New York, United States) is an American guitarist, singer, and songwriter. He is best known as a guitarist and vocalist in the blues trio Koerner, Ray & Glover, with Dave Ray and Tony Glover. He has also made albums as a solo performer and with Willie Murphy.

Biography
Koerner grew up in Rochester, New York, and after a brief military service attended the University of Minnesota. He intended to major in engineering but soon became involved in the Minneapolis music scene, where he met Dave Ray and Tony Glover. They formed a loose-knit trio, releasing albums under the name Koerner, Ray & Glover. The group gained notice with their first album, Blues, Rags and Hollers, originally released by Audiophile in 1963 and re-released by Elektra Records later that year.

Koerner was an early influence on Bob Dylan, who mentioned Koerner in his autobiography, Chronicles. Speaking of the early 1960s, Koerner later said, "We were all goofy, you know. We were thinkers and drinkers and artists and players, and Dylan was one of us. He was another guy."

In 1965, Koerner recorded his first solo album, Spider Blues, for Elektra and appeared at the Newport Folk Festival accompanied by Glover. He continued playing on the folk circuit and joined with Willie Murphy to record Running, Jumping, Standing Still in 1969. The duo eventually split up, and Koerner pursued an unsuccessful career in filmmaking, retiring from music and moving to Copenhagen, Denmark. He later returned to music in the traditional folk genre and continued to perform and release new albums from time to time. He now lives in Minneapolis and has two sons and a daughter.

Awards
In 1983 the Minnesota Music Academy named Koerner, Ray and Glover "Best Folk Group" and in 1985 inducted them into the MMA Hall of Fame.

In 2008, Koerner, Ray & Glover were inducted into the Minnesota Blues Hall of Fame under the category Blues Recordings for Blues, Rags and Hollers.

Koerner, Ray & Glover has been honored with a star on the outside mural of the Minneapolis nightclub First Avenue, recognizing performers that have played sold-out shows or have otherwise demonstrated a major contribution to the culture at the iconic venue. Receiving a star "might be the most prestigious public honor an artist can receive in Minneapolis," according to journalist Steve Marsh.

Discography
with Koerner, Ray & Glover
Blues, Rags and Hollers (1963)
Lots More Blues, Rags and Hollers (1964)
The Return of Koerner, Ray & Glover (1965)
Good Old Koerner, Ray & Glover (1972)
One Foot in the Groove (1996)
with Willie Murphy
Running, Jumping, Standing Still (1969)
Music Is Just a Bunch of Notes (1972)
with Tony Glover
Live @ The 400 Bar (2009)
Solo
Spider Blues (1965)
Some American Folk Songs Like They Used To (1974)
Nobody Knows the Trouble I've Been (1986)
Raised by Humans (1992)
StarGeezer (1996)
March 1963 (2010)
What's Left of Spider John (2013)

In popular culture
Science fiction writer Spider Robinson adopted his nickname out of admiration for Koerner and his music.

References

External links
Official website
Interview with "Spider" John Koerner, The Current, Minnesota Public Radio, 2017
Illustrated Koerner, Ray & Glover discography

1938 births
Living people
University of Minnesota alumni
Musicians from Rochester, New York
Fingerstyle guitarists
American blues singer-songwriters
American blues guitarists
American male guitarists
Singer-songwriters from Minnesota
Guitarists from Minnesota
Elektra Records artists
Singer-songwriters from New York (state)
Guitarists from New York (state)
20th-century American guitarists
20th-century American male musicians
Red House Records artists
American male singer-songwriters